This is a list of poets whose works were included in the Kokin Wakashū, a tenth-century Japanese waka anthology.

List

A 
Ariwara no Motokata
Ariwara no Muneyana
Ariwara no Narihira (業平 Ariwara no Asomi Narihira)
Ariwara no Shigeharu
Ariwara no Yukihira ( Ariwara no Asomi Yukihira)

F 
Fujiwara no Kotonao
Fujiwara no Okikaze
Fun'ya no Yasuhide
Fujiwara no Yoruka ( Fujiwara no Asomi Yoruka)
Fujiwara no Yoshikaze

H 
Henjō ( Sōjō Henjō; birth name Yoshimine no Munesada )

I 
Ise

K 
Ki no Aritomo
Ki no Tomonori ( Ki no Asomi Tomonori)
Ki no Tsurayuki ( Ki no Asomi Tsurayuki)
Kisen ( Kisen-hōshi)
Emperor Kōkō ( Kōkō-in)
Prince Koretaka ( Koretaka-no-miko)

M 
Mibu no Tadamine
Minamoto no Muneyuki (宗于 Minamoto no Asomi Muneyuki)

N 
Emperor Nara ( Nara-no-mikado)
Empress Nijō ( Nijō-no-kisaki; also known as Fujiwara no Takaiko )

O 
Ono no Komachi
Ōshikōchi no Mitsune ( Ōshikōchi no Sukune Mitsune)
Ōtomo no Kuronushi ( Ōtomo no Muranushi Kuronushi)

S 
Sōku ( Sōku-hōshi, also read Zōku-hōshi)
Sosei ( Sosei-hōshi)
Sugano no Takayo

T 
Tachibana no Kiyoki
Tachibana no Kiyotomo
Tachibana no Nakamori

References

Citations

Works cited 

 

Lists of poets
Kokinshū poets